John Goddard (fl. 1645–1671) was an early English engraver. He was apprenticed to the engraver Robert Vaughan in 1631.

Works

Goddard is known mostly from a few portraits and book illustrations. The portraits include:

 Martin Billingsley, the writing master, in 1651.
 John Bastwick.
 Alexander Ross, in 1654, as frontispiece to Ross's continuation of Walter Raleigh's History of the World.

He engraved the title-page to William Austin's translation of Cicero's treatise, Cato Major, published in 1671. For Thomas Fuller's Pisgah-sight of Palestine, published in 1645, Goddard engraved the sheet of armorial bearings at the beginning, and some of the maps, including a ground plan of the Temple of Solomon. He worked also for the arms painter Sylvanus Morgan, and the writing-teachers Richard Gething and Thomas Shelton, and engraved maps for John Ferrar and Peter Heylyn. Further plates by him are known, including a set of The Seven Deadly Sins.

Notes

Attribution

English engravers
17th-century English people
Year of birth missing
Year of death missing